The 1996–97 Sri Lankan cricket season featured two Test series with Sri Lanka playing against Pakistan and India.

Honours
 P Saravanamuttu Trophy – Bloomfield Cricket and Athletic Club
 Hatna Trophy – Bloomfield Cricket and Athletic Club
 Most runs – RS Kaluwitharana 1172 @ 73.25 (HS 179)
 Most wickets – ADB Ranjith 70 @ 16.40 (BB 9-29)

Test series
The Sri Lanka v Pakistan series ended 0–0 with both matches drawn:
 1st Test @ R Premadasa Stadium, Colombo – match drawn
 2nd Test @ Sinhalese Sports Club Ground, Colombo – match drawn

Both Tests in the Sri Lanka v India series were drawn so the series result was 0-0:
 1st Test @ R Premadasa Stadium, Colombo – match drawn
 2nd Test @ Sinhalese Sports Club Ground, Colombo – match drawn

External sources
  CricInfo – brief history of Sri Lankan cricket
 CricketArchive – Tournaments in Sri Lanka

Further reading
 Wisden Cricketers' Almanack 1998

Sri Lankan cricket seasons from 1972–73 to 1999–2000